Directly elected Mayors or Leaders in England, informally known as Metro Mayors or Leaders, are local government executive leaders who are directly elected by the residents of a local authority area (typically, but not always, a metropolitan area). Examples of metro mayors include the Mayor of London, the Mayor of Greater Manchester, and the Mayor of the West Midlands, with the first County Leaders to be elected in Norfolk and Suffolk in 2024.

The first such political post was the mayor of London, created as the executive of the Greater London Authority in 2000 as part of a reform of the local government of Greater London. Since the Local Government Act 2000, all of the several hundred principal local councils in England and Wales are required to review their executive arrangements.

Most local authorities have a 'leader and cabinet' model where the council leader is selected from the councillors, but in some areas a 'mayor and cabinet' model has been adopted, where a directly elected mayor is established to replace the council leader. 

Legislation on directly elected mayors applies to England and Wales, but there are currently no directly elected mayors in Wales. As of May 2019, 15 council areas in England are using the 'mayor and cabinet' system.  Most authorities with elected mayors already had a ceremonial mayor and the latter role continues to exist.

History

Background
The system of elected mayors had been considered by the Major ministry, and the former Environment Secretary Michael Heseltine had been a proponent of it. The 1997 Labour manifesto included a commitment to reform local government in London by introducing an elected mayor.

Mayor of London

The first directly elected mayor was introduced in Greater London in 2000 as part of the statutory provisions of the Greater London Authority Act 1999. The position of the elected Mayor of London is a strategic regional one, and quite different from that of local authority mayors. The work of the Mayor of London is scrutinised by the London Assembly, a unique arrangement in the English local government system. The Mayor of London cannot be removed from office by a referendum following a petition, as is the case for directly elected mayors elsewhere in England.

The role should not be confused with the ancient position of Lord Mayor of London, elected annually by liverymen of the City of London.

Local Government Act 2000

Elsewhere in England and Wales, since the Local Government Act 2000, there have been a range of options for how a local council executive leadership can be constituted, and installing a directly elected mayor is one of these options. The 2000 act ended the previous committee-based system, where functions were exercised by committees of the council (although this was reinstated in 2012). All of several hundred principal councils were required to review their executive arrangements under the 2000 legislation. Local authorities considering the option of an elected mayor were required to put the question to a local referendum. It is also possible for campaign groups to trigger a local referendum  with a signed petition. A number of areas with elected mayors also have civic mayors or Lord mayors and these ceremonial roles conferred on acting councillors are separate from elected mayors.

From 2000 until 2022 all directly elected mayors in England were elected using the Supplementary Vote electoral system. Following the passing of the Elections Act 2022 future mayoral elections will be run using first past the post.

Adoption

Eleven mayors were established during 2002, in both metropolitan and non-metropolitan districts, unitary authorities and London boroughs. Three further mayoralties were created under this legislation: in 2005 (Torbay; abolished 2019), 2010 (Tower Hamlets), and 2015 (Copeland).

Some of the first mayoral elections were won by independents, notably in Hartlepool, where the election was won by Stuart Drummond, who played Hartlepool United's mascot; and in Middlesbrough, where it was won by former police officer Ray Mallon, who left the local police force to stand for election.

Although Wales is included in the legislation, only one Welsh authority, Ceredigion, held a referendum on such a proposal, in May 2004. Over 70% of the voters voted against the proposal.

Legislative changes

In October 2006, the DCLG white paper Strong and Prosperous Communities proposed that in future the requirement for a referendum to approve the establishment of an elected mayor for a council area be dropped in favour of a simple resolution of the council following community consultation. It also proposed the direct election of council cabinets where requested, and that the 'mayor and council manager' system in Stoke-on-Trent be reformed into a conventional 'mayor and cabinet' system, it having been the only English council to adopt that system. The 'mayor and council manager' option was later revoked by the Local Government and Public Involvement in Health Act 2007 and a referendum was no longer required if two thirds of a council voted in favour of the change in executive model. The elected cabinet option was not taken forward. The 2007 legislation required all local authorities to review their executive arrangements again and consider the case for an elected mayor.

City council mayors

In February 2006, the Institute for Public Policy Research published a report calling for elected mayors in Birmingham and Manchester, which was positively received by the government, but not by the two city councils concerned. Later Prime Minister David Cameron expressed support for the system, saying directly elected mayors are "accountable" and can "galvanise action". On 2 May 2012, think tank the Bow Group published a short article supporting directly elected mayors in large English cities.

The Localism Act 2011 permitted central government to trigger referendums for elected mayors, and this was intended to happen in the largest cities during 2012. Ahead of this, Leicester City Council in 2011 and Liverpool City Council in 2012 exercised their option to have a directly elected mayor without a referendum. In September 2011 citizens of Salford collected the required number of signatures to force a referendum, which was successful. The first mayoral election took place in May 2012.

Using the powers in the Localism Act 2011, on 3 May 2012, referendums were held in 10 English cities to decide whether or not to switch to a system that includes a directly elected mayor. Only one, Bristol, voted for a mayoral system. Doncaster voted to retain its elected mayoral system in a referendum held on the same day.

Combined Authority ("Metro") Mayors

In 2014 it was announced that a Mayor of Greater Manchester would be created as leader of the Greater Manchester Combined Authority, subject to new primary legislation. In 2017 elections were held for Greater Manchester, the Liverpool City Region, the Tees Valley, West of England and the West Midlands as part of the devolution deals allowed by the Cities and Local Government Devolution Act 2016.  The delayed election for the Sheffield City Region followed in May 2018. , the North East Combined Authority is the only combined authority without a mayor.

Removing the post of mayor
Executive arrangement reviews, petitions and local referendums in the Local Government Act 2000 can also be used to remove the post of mayor and revert to the typical "leader and cabinet" executive arrangement. Such methods could not initially be used to remove the post of mayor if it was established following a Government-mandated referendum. However, a House of Lords amendment to the Cities and Local Government Devolution Act 2016 modified the Local Government Act 2000 to establish the right of a future referendum to abolish any local authority elected mayor established following a Government-mandated referendum.

Councillors have complained about the perceived excessive power of directly elected mayors. There have been campaigns in four of the local authorities with directly elected mayors to hold referendums to abolish the posts. In Lewisham, the Bring Back Democracy campaign called for a new referendum, citing poor turnout and a very close result in the 2001 referendum. In April 2007, Lewisham Council voted 28–24 against a motion calling for consultation over the issue.

In Doncaster, in March 2007, "Fair Deal" campaigners presented an 11,000-signature petition to the council calling for a new referendum. The council voted 31–27 in favour of a new referendum, which was held in May 2012. The electorate voted in favour of retaining the mayoralty. The Middlesbrough electorate also voted to retain the mayoral system.

Two councils have reverted to leader and cabinet executives. The electorate of Stoke-on-Trent voted to remove the post of elected mayor on 23 October 2008, to be replaced with a system of council leader and cabinet. In November 2012 Hartlepool also voted to scrap the position of directly elected mayor in a referendum.

Referendums were held in North Tyneside and Torbay in May 2016 to determine the future of their mayoralties. While North Tyneside voted to retain the system, Torbay voted in favour of returning to a leader and cabinet style of governance.  Further referendums were held in May 2021 in Newham and Tower Hamlets, which both voted to retain the mayoral system.

Bristol voted to remove the post of elected mayor in a referendum on 5 May 2022, to be replaced with a committee system.

Scotland and Northern Ireland
The Local Government Act 2000 does not apply in Scotland and the Scottish Parliament has chosen to reform local government instead by introducing the Single Transferable Vote electoral system. The Scottish Conservatives support elected mayors where there is found to be "local demand in our major towns and cities". A mayor in Scotland is traditionally known as a provost.

There are no directly elected mayors in Northern Ireland.  Offices of mayors in Northern Ireland are only a ceremonial position.

Powers
The powers of the mayor are commensurate with the kind of local authority for which they are the executive. London borough councils, metropolitan district councils and unitary authority councils have broadly similar functions, but for non-metropolitan district councils it is a subset, for example not having power over education, libraries and waste management. The Mayor of London has completely different powers to the "mayor and cabinet" leaders.

A local-authority elected mayor has powers similar to those of the executive committee in a Leader and Cabinet model local authority. These are described as either "exclusive" powers or "co-decision" powers and are defined in the Local Government (Functions and Responsibilities) (England) Regulations 2000.

Co-decision powers are those the mayor shares with the council, notably the power to make the local authority's annual budget and its policy framework documents. These are: Annual Library Plan; Best Value Performance Plan; Children's Services Plan; Community Care Plan; Community Strategy; Crime and Disorder Reduction Strategy; Early Years Development Plan; Education Development Plan; Local Development Framework; and the Youth Justice Plan. To amend or reject a mayor's proposals for any of these documents, the council must resolve to do so by a two-thirds majority. This is again based on secondary legislation, in this case the Local Government (Standing Orders) (England) Regulations 2001.

Exclusive powers are less easy to define, because they consist of all the powers that are granted to a local authority by Act of Parliament except those defined either as co-decision powers or as "not to be the responsibility of an authority's executive". This latter is a limited list, including quasi-judicial decisions on planning and licensing, and certain ceremonial, employment and legal decisions.

An elected mayor (in a mayor and cabinet system) also has the power to appoint up to nine councillors as members of a cabinet and to delegate powers, either to them as individuals, or to the Mayor and Cabinet committee, or to subcommittees of the Mayor and Cabinet committee. In practice, the mayor remains personally accountable, so most mayors have chosen to delegate to a very limited extent—if at all.

Local authorities in Britain remain administered by a permanent staff of chief officers led by a chief executive or chief operating officer  who are politically neutral bureaucrats. Their powers remain unaffected by the introduction of elected mayor. Senior officers continue to be appointed by a politically representative committee of councillors, and the mayor may not attempt to influence the decision as to who is appointed (except within the committee as a member of the committee). To maintain the staff's professional and political independence, the mayor (or any other member of the council) may not personally direct any member of staff. Accordingly, an elected mayor cannot really be accurately characterised as an executive mayor, as in parts of the US and certain other countries, but more as a semi-executive mayor.

Consultations took place in 12 English cities due to have referendums over the introduction of elected mayors, over what powers those mayors should have, and how they should be scrutinised.

Referendum results

As of October 2021, there have been 54 referendums on the question of changing executive arrangements to a model with an elected mayor. Referendums are triggered by council resolution, local petition or central government intervention. Of these, 17 have resulted in the establishment of a new mayoralty and 37 have been rejected by voters. Average "yes" vote is 45%. Typical turnout is around 30%, but has been as low as 10% and as high as 64%. The turnout is higher when the referendum coincides with another vote, such as an election.

There have been eight referendums on the question of removing the post of elected mayor. Three mayoral posts have been disestablished following a vote and five retained.

Two local authority mayors, those for Leicester and Liverpool, were created by city council resolution without holding a referendum.

List of directly elected mayors
, there are 26 directly elected mayors in England.

Mayoralties covering more than one local authority

Mayoralties covering a single local authority

Proposed Mayoralties / Leaders

Former mayoralties

Former mayoralties are:

Notes

References

External links
 Directory of current mayors
 House of Commons Library Briefing Note
 Arguments for elected mayors
 Arguments against elected mayors
 Institute for Government mayoral pages
 Warwick Commission on Elected Mayors and City Leadership